Canadian nationality law details the conditions by which a person is a national of Canada. The primary law governing these regulations is the Citizenship Act, which came into force on 15 February 1977 and is applicable to all provinces and territories of Canada.

With few exceptions, almost all individuals born in the country are automatically citizens at birth. Foreign nationals may naturalize after living in Canada for at least three years while holding permanent residence and showing proficiency in the English or French language.

Canada is composed of several former British colonies whose residents were British subjects. After Confederation into a Dominion within the British Empire in 1867, Canada was granted more autonomy over time and gradually became indepenent from the United Kingdom. Although Canadian citizens have no longer been British subjects since 1977, they continue to hold favored status when residing in the UK. As Commonwealth citizens, Canadians are eligible to vote in UK elections and serve in public office there.

Creation of Canadian citizenship

Canadian citizenship was created as a legal status by the Canadian Citizenship Act, 1946, enacted by the Parliament of Canada in 1946 and brought into effect on 1 January 1947. Prior to that time, Canadians were British subjects under British, Canadian and other Commonwealth law, with rights throughout the Commonwealth. Right of entry into Canada, domicile, and rights as nationals were determined by Canadian law. The Canadian Citizenship Act, 1946 changed that situation, creating the legal status of Canadian citizen, separate from status as British subject.  Canadian citizenship is now governed by the Citizenship Act, enacted in 1977. British subject status was abolished in Canadian law in 1977.

Acquisition and loss of citizenship 
Nearly all individuals born in Canada receive Canadian citizenship at birth, including those who were born in Canadian airspace, internal and territorial waters, and Canadian-registered ships and aircraft. The only exceptions are children born to two foreign parents with at least one who is employed by a foreign government, an employee of a foreign government, or an organization with diplomatic immunity. Abandoned children found before the age of seven are assumed to have been born in Canada, unless contrary evidence is found within seven years of discovery.

Children born overseas are Canadian citizens by descent if either parent is a citizen by birth or naturalization in Canada. Citizenship by descent is limited to only one generation born outside of the country, other than children or grandchildren of members of the Canadian Armed Forces. Adopted children are treated as if they were naturally born to the adopting parents and are subject to the same regulations regarding birthplace and descent.

Naturalization 
Foreign permanent residents or status Indians over the age of 18 may become Canadian citizens by grant after residing in Canada for more than three years. Candidates must be physically present in the country for at least 1,095 days during the five-year period immediately preceding their applications. This requirement may be partially met by time spent within the country before acquiring permanent residency; applicants may count each day within the preceding five-year period that they were present in Canada as a temporary resident or protected person as half a day of physical presence for this condition, up to a maximum of 365 days.

Applicants must have filed income taxes for three of the preceding five years, and those between the ages of 18 and 54 must additionally demonstrate proficiency in either the English or French language and pass the Canadian Citizenship Test. Minor children under the age of 18 who have a Canadian parent or are naturalizing at the same time as a parent are not required to fulfill the physical presence or tax filing requirements, but those applying separately are subject to those conditions. Successful applicants over the age of 14 are required to take an oath of citizenship.

Permanent residents in the Canadian Armed Forces may alternatively fulfill the physical presence requirement with 1,095 days of completed military service during the preceding six-year period. Foreign military servicemembers attached to the CAF with an equivalent amount of completed service time are exempt from holding permanent residence or filing income taxes. Stateless individuals under the age of 23 who were born overseas to at least one Canadian citizen after 17 April 2009 and meet the 1,095-day physical presence requirement for a four-year period may also be granted citizenship.

The Minister of Immigration, Refugees and Citizenship has discretionary power to waive language and citizenship test requirements for any candidates in compassionate circumstances, and the citizenship oath requirement for applicants with mental disabilities. The Minister also may grant citizenship extraordinarily without any requirements to persons who are stateless, subject to "special and unusual hardship", or have made exceptional contributions to the country. These atypical grants have been conferred more than 500 times since 1977, often on athletes competing for Canada internationally. The Parliament of Canada occasionally bestows honorary Canadian citizenship on exceptional foreigners, but this distinction is symbolic and does not grant awarded individuals substantive rights in Canada.

Before 2015, the physical presence requirement was 1,095 days within a four-year period. Between 17 June 2015 and 11 October 2017, this was extended to 1,460 days within a six-year period, with an additional presence requirement of 183 days per year in four of those six years. Time spent within the country as a non-permanent resident was not counted toward the stricter presence requirements. The age range of applicants subject to language and citizenship tests during this regulatory period was between the ages of 14 and 65.

Automatic mass resumption and special grants
On 17 April 2009, Bill C-37 resumed Canadian citizenship to all of those who have obtained Canadian citizenship on or after 1 January 1947 by birth or naturalization in Canada but have involuntarily lost it under the 1947 Act, and their first-generation descendants born abroad were also granted Canadian citizenship on that day.

The 2015 amendment (Bill C-24) of the 1977 Act, which went into effect on 11 June 2015, granted Canadian citizenship for the first time to people who were born in Canada before 1 January 1947 (or 1 April 1949 if born in Newfoundland and Labrador), ceased to be British subjects before that day, and never became Canadian citizens after 1947 (or 1949). Under the 1947 Act, these people were never considered to be Canadian citizens because they had lost their British subject status before the creation of Canadian citizenship. Persons who had voluntarily renounced British subject status or had their British subject status revoked are not included in the grant.

Although not included in section 5.1, persons who were adopted before 1 January 1947 were also granted Canadian citizenship on 11 June 2015 if their adoptive parents can pass down citizenship by descent and they had never received Canadian citizenship.

On 22 September 1988, Prime Minister Brian Mulroney agreed to a redress package for Japanese-Canadians deported from Canada between 1941 and 1946 (about 4,000 in total) and their descendants. The package authorized a special grant of Canadian citizenship for any such person.  All descendants of deported persons were also eligible for the grant of citizenship provided that they were living on 22 September 1988, regardless of whether the person deported from Canada was still alive.

Although Bill C-24 covered the majority of ex-British subjects who would have acquired citizenship in 1947, a certain number of female ex-British subjects were excluded from the Bill, mainly those born in another part of the British Empire other than Canada, had been residing in Canada long enough to qualify for citizenship under the 1947 Act, but had lost their British subject status either by marrying a foreign man before 1947, or losing British subject status when her spouse naturalized in another country. These people can acquire Canadian citizenship under subsection 11(2) of the 1977 Act by a simple declaration made to the IRCC. There are no additional requirements other than the declaration.

Renunciation and revocation 
Canadian citizenship can be relinquished by applying for renunciation, provided that the applicant already possesses or will possess another nationality. Individuals who automatically acquired citizenship in 2009 or 2015 because of amendments to nationality law in those years have a special route for renunciation that only requires that they are citizens of another country and costs no fees.

Former citizens who renounced their nationality may subsequently apply for nationality restoration, after reacquiring permanent residency and being physically present in Canada for at least 365 days during the two-year period preceding their applications. They must also have filed income taxes for the prior year. Individuals who had their citizenships revoked are ineligible for nationality resumption and must follow the naturalization process instead.

Citizenship may be revoked from individuals who fraudulently acquired it, and renunciations may be similarly rescinded from persons who provided false information during that process. The Federal Court holds decision-making power for all revocation cases, except where the individual in question specifically requests the IRCC Minister to make that decision. Additionally, between 28 May 2015 and 19 June 2017, Canadians holding another citizenship who were convicted of treason or terrorism were liable for potential citizenship revocation.

Birth overseas before 2009 
From 1 January 1947 to 14 February 1977, children born abroad to a married Canadian father or unmarried Canadian mother acquired citizenship if their birth was registered at a Canadian diplomatic mission within two years of birth. The two-year registration limit was removed in 1977 and persons who were not previously registered were able to do so. Children of married Canadian mothers also became eligible in that year to apply for facilitated grants of citizenship. A 2004 Federal Court ruling further allowed children born abroad to unmarried Canadian fathers to apply for facilitated grants from 17 May 2004 until the registration period ended for all eligible individuals on 14 August 2004. Individuals who became citizens through delayed registration received citizenship retroactive to birth, while those who received facilitated grants were not considered citizens retroactive to birth. Those who failed to register or apply for a facilitated grant before 14 August 2004 automatically became citizens by descent on 17 April 2009, subject to exceptions, including those born after the first generation.

Between 15 February 1977 and 17 April 2009, individuals born abroad to a Canadian parent automatically acquired citizenship at birth. However, those who were born abroad after the first generation between 15 February 1977 and 16 April 1981 automatically lost their citizenship unless they applied for retention before the age of 28. These persons were required to have lived in Canada for at least one year before applying for retention or established a substantial connection with the country between the ages of 14 and 28. Individuals failing to apply for retention lost their citizenship even if they were living in Canada on their 28th birthday.

Under section 6 of the original 1947 Act in force until 1970, Canadian citizens by descent were required to renounce all foreign citizenship and make a declaration of retention after they attained 21 years of age. Failing to do so before their 22nd birthday would cause the loss of Canadian citizenship on that day. The requirement to renounce foreign citizenships was abolished in 1970, and automatic loss was postponed to the 24th birthday of applicable individuals. Retention would be granted to any person who had a Canadian domicile on their 21st birthday or those who had submitted a declaration of retention before their 24th birthday.

Unlike that of the 1977 Act which required the affected persons to make an application with the possibility of being refused, the 1947 Act's retention clauses merely required those affected to make a declaration. The clauses also did not make a distinction between the first-generation born abroad to Canada-born or naturalized parents, and second and subsequent generations born abroad. However, under Bill C-37, only those who were the first generation born abroad were able to have their Canadian citizenship restored, while second and subsequent generations born abroad remain foreign if they had failed to retain their Canadian citizenship under the 1947 Act.

Children of diplomats
Section 5 of the 1946 Act did not originally have any exception for children of foreign diplomats born in Canada, so persons born to diplomats in Canada after 1946 were potentially Canadian citizens by birth. This provision was changed in 1950 when Parliament amended the Act, providing that the children of foreign diplomats who were born in Canada after 1 January 1947 did not acquire Canadian citizenship. The exception also applied to Canadian-born children of employees of foreign governments, and to Canadian-born children of foreign employees of diplomats.

Involuntary loss in previous provisions
Between 1947 and 1977, several Canadian citizens had involuntarily lost their citizenship under the 1947 Act, mostly by acquiring the nationality or citizenship of another country. These persons' citizenships were restored en masse on 17 April 2009. Under the 1977 Act, there were no automatic losses of Canadian citizenship until the period between 2005 and 2009 when some Canadians lost their citizenship due to their failure to file for the retention of citizenship.

Lost Canadians

The term "Lost Canadians" is used to refer to persons who believed themselves to be Canadian citizens but have lost or never acquired Canadian citizenship due to the legal hurdles in the 1947 Act.

Under the 1947 Act, a person must be a British subject on 1 January 1947 for them to acquire Canadian citizenship. Hence certain persons who were born, naturalized, or domiciled in Canada before the enactment of the 1947 Act were ineligible for Canadian citizenship, which included the following groups:

 Any person born, naturalized, or domiciled in Canada who had lost their British subject status on or before 31 December 1946 (mostly by naturalizing in a country outside the British Empire);
 Any person born, naturalized, or domiciled in Newfoundland who had lost their British subject status on or before 31 March 1949, unless they already acquired Canadian citizenship;
 Any woman who had married a non-British subject man between 22 May 1868 and 14 January 1932 (loss was automatic even when the woman did not acquire her husband's citizenship); and,
 Any women who had married a non-British subject between 15 January 1932 and 31 December 1946 when she acquired her husband's nationality.

After the enactment of the 1947 Act, Canadian citizenship could be automatically lost between 1 January 1947 and 14 February 1977, by the following acts:

 voluntarily (i.e., other than marriage) acquiring citizenship of any other country, including a Commonwealth country (loss of citizenship would happen even when the acquisition of another citizenship took place on Canadian soil);
 absenting from Canada for over six years (unless qualified for an exemption) for naturalized Canadians (before 1953) or ten years (before 1967);
 loss of citizenship of the responsible parent (father when born in wedlock; mother when born out of wedlock or when having custody) when the person was a minor (only when they are a citizen of another country or have received foreign citizenship along with the parent); or,
 if not residing in Canada, failing to apply for retention of Canadian citizenship before the age of 24 (for persons born outside Canada before 15 February 1953) or 22 (for those born in 1948 or earlier).

The loss of British subject status or Canadian citizenship could occur even when the person was physically in Canada.

Certain Canadian residents born before 1977, including but not limited to war brides and persons who were born outside Canada to Canadian citizens (primarily those who were born to Canadian servicemen or in U.S. hospitals along the Canada–United States border who automatically acquired U.S. citizenship at birth), also do not possess Canadian citizenship, because it was not possible to automatically acquire Canadian citizenship without voluntarily applying for naturalization (for war brides) or registering at a Canadian mission (for children of Canadians). Some of those people have been living in Canada for their entire lives with little knowledge of their lack of Canadian citizenship. To solve this problem, the federal government had undertaken several legislative processes to reduce and eliminate these cases.

The problem first arose in February 2007, when the House of Commons Standing Committee on Citizenship and Immigration held hearings on so-called Lost Canadians, who found out on applying for passports that, for various reasons, they may not be Canadian citizens as they thought. Don Chapman, a witness before the committee, estimated that 700,000 Canadians had either lost their citizenship or were at risk of having it stripped. However, Citizenship and Immigration Minister Diane Finley said her office had just 881 calls on the subject. On 19 February 2007, she granted citizenship to 33 such individuals. Some of the people affected reside in towns near the border, and hence were born in American hospitals. Others, particularly Mennonites, were born to Canadian parents outside Canada. An investigation by the CBC, based on Canadian census data, concluded that the problem could affect an estimated 10,000 to 20,000 individuals residing in Canada at the time.

On 29 May 2007, Canadian Minister of Citizenship and Immigration Diane Finley announced her proposal to amend the 1977 Act for the first time. Under the proposal, which eventually became Bill C-37, anyone naturalized in Canada since 1947 would have citizenship even if they lost it under the 1947 Act. Also, anyone born in 1947 outside the country to a Canadian mother or father, in or out of wedlock, would have citizenship if they are the first generation born abroad. Appearing before the Standing Committee on Citizenship and Immigration, Finley asserted that as of 24 May 2007, there were only 285 cases of individuals in Canada whose citizenship status needs to be resolved. As persons born prior to 1947 were not covered by Bill C-37, they would have to apply for special naturalization before Bill C-24's passage in 2015.

Under Bill C-37 and Bill C-24 which went into effect on 17 April 2009 and 11 June 2015, respectively, Canadian citizenship was restored or granted for those who have involuntarily lost their Canadian citizenship under the 1947 Act or British subject status before 1947, as well as their children.

Multiple citizenship
The attitude toward multiple citizenships in Canada has changed significantly over time. Between 1 January 1947 and 14 February 1977, multiple citizenships were only allowed under limited circumstances. On 15 February 1977, the restrictions on multiple citizenships ended.

The number of Canadians with multiple citizenships is difficult to determine because of the changes in Canadian and foreign laws. In 2006, around 863,000 Canadian citizens residing in Canada reported in the census to hold at least one more citizenship or nationality of another country. The actual figure, however, is substantially higher, as the federal government does not maintain statistics on persons with multiple citizenships who reside abroad. The en masse citizenship grant and restoration in 2009 and 2015 further increased the number of Canadians with multiple citizenships, as Canadian citizenship was restored or granted to most of the people who lost their Canadian citizenship or British subject status by acquiring citizenship of another country. These people, as well as their descendants, are de jure Canadians with multiple citizenships even when they do not exercise citizenship rights (e.g., travelling on a Canadian passport).

Although not a legal requirement, Canadian citizens with multiple citizenships are required to carry a Canadian passport when boarding their flights to Canada since November 2016 unless they are dual Canadian-American citizens carrying a valid United States passport. This is caused by the amended visa policy, which imposed a pre-screening requirement on visa-exempt nationalities. Those entering Canada by land or sea are not subject to this restriction.

Under the current Act and its amendments
The 1977 Act removed all restrictions on multiple citizenships and Canadian citizens acquiring another citizenship on or after 15 February 1977 would no longer lose their Canadian citizenship.

Those who lost their Canadian citizenship or British subject status under the 1947 Act or the British 1914 Act regained or gained Canadian citizenship in 2009 and 2015, respectively. The grant and resumption under Bill C-37 and Bill C-24 included these people's children.

Under the 1947 Act
Although multiple citizenships were severely restricted under the 1947 Act, it was still possible to be a citizen of Canada and another country so long as the acquisition of the other citizenship or nationality is involuntary. A person may involuntarily acquire citizenship of another country when:

 they were born in a country with jus soli citizenship law (e.g., the United States) and they were also registered as a Canadian citizen;
 they became a citizen of another country because of a change of law in that country (e.g., on 1 January 1949 the United Kingdom conferred Citizenship of the United Kingdom and Colonies, or CUKC status, on any person born in the United Kingdom, and these people later became British citizens in 1983);
 they acquired the other citizenship by formal marriage to a foreign man (e.g., Italy before 1983);
 they were naturalized as a Canadian citizen and did not lose their foreign citizenship under the other country's nationality law (e.g., New Zealand).

Before 1947
Like peoples of all other British colonies and Dominions at the time, those born in Canada before 1947 were British subjects by nationality under the British Nationality and Status of Aliens Act 1914. The term "Canadian citizen", however, was first created under the Immigration Act 1910 to identify a British subject who was born in Canada or who possessed Canadian domicile, which could be acquired by any British subject who had lawfully resided in Canada for at least three years. At that time, "Canadian citizenship" was solely an immigration term and not a nationality term, hence "Canadian citizens" under the Immigration Act would be subject to the same rules on acquisition and loss of British subject status under the British Nationality and Status of Aliens Act 1914. Under the Immigration Act 1910, "Canadian citizenship" would be lost for any person who had ceased to be a British subject, as well as non-Canadian born or naturalized British subjects who "voluntarily [reside] outside Canada". While the former would lose "Canadian citizenship" and British subject status simultaneously, the latter would only stop being a "Canadian citizen". Canadian-born or naturalized British subjects would not lose their Canadian domicile by residing outside Canada.

The only circumstance in which a British subject could acquire de jure dual citizenship was by birth to a British subject father in a country that offered birthright citizenship (e.g., the United States). However, "Canadian citizens" may acquire de facto dual citizenship by residing in another British Dominion, protectorate, or colony, as they would simultaneously have "Canadian citizenship" and, if residing long enough to meet the requirements, the domicile of that Dominion, protectorate, or colony.

To further separate British subjects domiciled in Canada from other British subjects, the term "Canadian National" was created by the Canadian Nationals Act 1921 on 3 May of that year. The status was bestowed on all holders of "Canadian citizenship" and their wives, but also included all children born outside Canada to Canadian National fathers, regardless of whether possessing British subject status at the time of birth. This 1921 Act also provided a path for certain Canadian Nationals who were born outside Canada, or who were born in Canada but had the domicile of the United Kingdom or another Dominion at birth or as a minor, to relinquish their Canadian nationality and domicile. Before the passage of the 1921 Act, "Canadian citizens" who were born in Canada had no course to abandon their Canadian domicile without having to relinquish their British subject status altogether. As Canadian nationality was also independent of their British subject status, the renunciation under the 1921 Act would not affect their British subject status, although they would also not become Canadian citizens on 1 January 1947 when it was first created.

Rights and privileges 

Canadian citizens have the unrestricted right to enter and remain in the country and cannot be deported (but are subject to Canada's extradition laws and treaties). They are eligible to apply for Canadian passports, required to serve in a jury when summoned, and may enlist in the Canadian Armed Forces. Citizens may petition the Chief Herald for an armorial grant, be awarded the Order of Canada, and receive an appointment to the Senate. They are also eligible to vote in and stand for office in elections for the House of Commons of Canada, provincial legislative assemblies, and local municipal governments.

When travelling in other countries, citizens may seek consular protection from Canadian diplomatic missions or from Australian missions in certain areas where the two countries have arranged for shared services. In foreign non-Commonwealth nations where neither Canadian nor Australian consular posts are available, they may request assistance from British embassies and consulates. Canadians may enter 183 countries and territories without a visa, as of 2020.

Canadian citizens are not considered foreigners when residing in the United Kingdom and are entitled to certain rights as Commonwealth citizens. These include exemption from registration with local police, voting eligibility in UK elections, and the ability to enlist in the British Armed Forces. They are also eligible to serve in non-reserved Civil Service posts, be granted British honours, receive peerages, and sit in the House of Lords. However, the Government of Canada generally opposes such the grant of such British honours per terms of the Nickle Resolution, unless prior permission is obtained. If given indefinite leave to remain (ILR), they are eligible to stand for election to the House of Commons of the United Kingdom and local government.

Canadian royal family 

Although the monarch of Canada primarily resides in the United Kingdom, the sovereign is the physical embodiment of the Canadian state and is, therefore, considered Canadian. Members of the royal family are personal subjects of the Canadian monarch and not foreigners; but, there is no legal provision that grants them automatic citizenship, residency, or any particular rights in Canadian law. Queen Elizabeth II had, and other royal family members have, occasionally described Canada as "home" and themselves as Canadian.

Proving Canadian citizenship
Under current rules, the federal government has designated a number of documents as proof of citizenship:

 Birth certificate issued by a provincial or territorial government;
 Certificate of citizenship (including citizenship cards);
 Certificate of naturalization (only issued to British subjects before 1 January 1947);
 Certificate of retention (only issued between 1 January 1947 and 16 April 2009);
 Certificate of registration of birth abroad (only issued between 1 January 1947 and 14 February 1977).

Among these documents, only the certificate of citizenship is still being issued by the federal government. The certificate is automatically issued to an individual who has become a Canadian citizen through naturalization, as well as to citizens born outside of Canada, but can also be issued to any Canadian upon request. If requested, a certificate is only issued after a complete investigation on whether the individual possesses Canadian citizenship under the current or historical legislation. The certificate replaced the wallet-sized citizenship card on 1 February 2012 and can be verified electronically, but unlike the citizenship card, it can no longer be used as an identification document as it does not contain a photo. The citizenship card was originally issued between 1954 and 1977 as a supplement of the larger certificate before the 1977 Act. Between 1977 and 2012, it was the only valid proof of Canadian citizenship for those who acquired citizenship through naturalization or by descent.

As those who were born in Canada normally acquired citizenship at birth under both 1947 and 1977 Acts, birth certificates issued by the provincial or territorial government are usually considered by Immigration, Refugees and Citizenship Canada as adequate proof of citizenship. There are, however, complications when the person failed to acquire Canadian citizenship because of the exceptions listed under s. 3(2) of the Act. As the federal government does not keep records of the immigration statuses of parents at birth, a person may be recognized as a Canadian based solely on their birth within Canada when, in fact, they do not possess Canadian citizenship under s. 3(2). Deepan Budlakoti, a stateless man born in Ontario, was twice issued a valid Canadian passport based on his Ontario birth certificate before the federal government realized that he is not a Canadian citizen under s. 3(2) and revoked his Canadian passport.

Documents other than those listed above are not considered as proof of citizenship, including Canadian passports, which are issued only after review of other documentary proof, as noted above. Church-issued baptismal certificates and birth certificates issued by an authority other than a provincial or territorial government are also not proof of Canadian citizenship. Such certificates were common in Quebec, as the provincial government did not start to issue birth certificates until 1994.

A special birth certificate issued by the Department of National Defence to children of CAF members born abroad before 1979, known as DND 419, is not proof of citizenship due to the lack of legal status of the certificate. This has caused difficulties for some individuals as they were forced to apply for a certificate of citizenship to confirm their status and to apply for a passport.

References

Citations

General sources

Legislation

Publications

Further reading 

 DeRocco David, John F. Chabot (2008), From Sea to Sea to Sea: A Newcomer's Guide to Canada, Full Blast Productions, 
 
 
 Stanford, Frances (2003), Citizenship and Immigration: Becoming a Canadian, S&S Learning Materials,

External links
 IRCC citizenship information
 Full text of the Citizenship Act
 Citizenship Policy Manuals

 
Canada and the Commonwealth of Nations